Désiré is a 1996 French film directed by Bernard Murat. The film is based on the play of the same name by Sacha Guitry.

Plot
Désiré is a mature, accomplished butler and moreover a Don Juan who regularly seduces the ladies of the house and then moves on. But one fine day he really falls in love.

Cast
 Jean-Paul Belmondo as Désiré  
 Fanny Ardant as Odette  
 Claude Rich as Montignac  
 Béatrice Dalle as Madeleine  
 Jean Yanne as Corniche  
 Dominique Lavanant as Henriette  
 Annie Grégorio as Adèle

References

External links 
 
Desire at le Film Guide

1996 films
French films based on plays
Films based on works by Sacha Guitry
Films directed by Bernard Murat
1990s French-language films
1990s French films